Henry Perks (1912 – after 1936) was a Welsh professional footballer who played as an outside forward. He played in the Football League for Cardiff City and Newport County and later played for non-league sides Barry and Milford United.

References

1912 births
Date of death missing
Welsh footballers
Footballers from Cardiff
Cardiff City F.C. players
Newport County A.F.C. players
Barry Town United F.C. players
English Football League players
Association football forwards
Milford United F.C. players